Neil Brew (born 8 March 1979 in Murupara, New Zealand) is a rugby union player. He plays at centre.

Prior to joining Kobe in 2010, Brew played for the Otago Highlanders in the Super 14 championships in New Zealand and Bristol in the Guinness Premiership in England.

Brew has played for New Zealand Maori.

Neil Brew was signed to play for the Highlanders in 2013 but didn't play a game.

He played for Toshiba Brave Lupus in the Japanese Top League.

Currently he teaches at Balmacewen Intermediate.

References

External links
Bristol Rugby profile
Sky Sports profile

1979 births
Living people
Bristol Bears players
Māori All Blacks players
People from Murupara
New Zealand expatriate sportspeople in England
Highlanders (rugby union) players
Hurricanes (rugby union) players
Otago rugby union players
Taranaki rugby union players
Rugby union centres
Toshiba Brave Lupus Tokyo players
Green Rockets Tokatsu players
New Zealand expatriate rugby union players
Expatriate rugby union players in England
Expatriate rugby union players in Japan
New Zealand expatriate sportspeople in Japan
Rugby union players from the Bay of Plenty Region